During the 2017–18 season, Lorca FC are participating in the Spanish LaLiga 1,2,3, and the Copa del Rey.

Squad

Transfers
List of Spanish football transfers summer 2017#Lorca FC

In

Out

Competitions

Overall

Liga

League table

Matches

Kickoff times are in CET.

Copa del Rey

References

Lorca FC seasons
Lorca FC